Mrs. Fitzherbert may refer to:
 Maria Fitzherbert (1756–1837), putative wife of George IV of the United Kingdom
 Mrs. Fitzherbert, U.S. title of Princess Fitz, 1945 historical novel by Winifred Carter
 Mrs. Fitzherbert (film), 1947 adaptation of Princess Fitz, also released as Princess Fitz and A Court Secret.
 Mrs Fitzherbert, 1960 biography by Anita Leslie

See also
 Fitzherbert (disambiguation)